Kathryn Augustyn (born June 29, 1984) is an American rugby union player. She was named in the Eagles 2017 Women's Rugby World Cup squad. She also represented the United States at the 2014 Women's Rugby World Cup.

References

External links 
 Katy Augustyn at USA Rugby
 

1984 births
Living people
American female rugby union players
United States women's international rugby union players
Northeastern University alumni
21st-century American women